Mario Rokhmanto (born July 16, 1992) is an Indonesian footballer who currently plays for Persela Lamongan in the Indonesia Super League.

Club statistics

Hounors

Clubs
Persela U-21 :
Indonesia Super League U-21 champions : 2 (2010-11, 2012)

References

External links

1992 births
Association football defenders
Living people
Indonesian footballers
Liga 1 (Indonesia) players
Persela Lamongan players